John Robert Ryan (29 December 1948 – 2 May 1982) was an Australian rugby union and professional rugby league footballer who played in the 1970s and 1980s. He played representative level rugby union (RU) for Australia and club level rugby league (RL) for the Penrith Panthers.

Ryan, a wing, was born in Wahroonga, New South Wales and claimed a total of 6 international rugby caps for Australia. He scored nine tries for Australia, and scored at least one try in every rugby union international.

He subsequently turned professional as a rugby league footballer with Penrith Panthers, but died at his home of a heart attack in 1982.

References

1948 births
1982 deaths
Australia international rugby union players
Australian male criminals
Australian people who died in prison custody
Australian rugby league players
Australian rugby union players
Penrith Panthers players
People convicted of robbery
Rugby league players from Sydney
Sportspeople convicted of crimes
Rugby union wings
Rugby union players from Sydney